The Great American Midrange is the fourth and final original full-length album from American rock band The Elms. The album was released via the band's own Trust, Inc., label on September 15, 2009, and is the highest-charting album of The Elms' career, entering the Billboard Heatseekers chart at #18 during the week of October 3, 2009.

The album's first single and video were for the song "Back to Indiana." The song had its national premiere during ABC's television coverage of the 93rd Indianapolis 500 motorcar race. The song was also named official theme song of the 2010 Big 10 Men's College Basketball Tournament. Album track "The Shake" appeared on EA Sports' hockey video game NHL 09.

Track listing 
 Strut
 Unless God Appears First
 County Fair
 The Wildest Heart
 Long Gone
 The Shake
 The Good Guys
 The Little Ways
 Back to Indiana
 This Is How the World Will End
 Thunderhead
 A Place in the Sun

iTunes exclusive
 Dog Days
Amazon exclusive
 Lily
Rhapsody exclusive
 Track-by-track synopsis from Owen Thomas

Recording 
Recording sessions took place in February and March 2009 at Warner Studios in Nashville, Tennessee. The album was mixed at Studio X in Seattle, Washington, in April 2009.

Personnel 
The Elms
Owen Thomas – vocals, guitar, songwriting
Christopher Thomas – drums, percussion
Thomas Daugherty – guitar
Nathan W. Bennett – bass guitar
Additional personnel
Brent Milligan – producer, engineer
Andrew Bazinet – engineer
David Alan – keyboards
Adam Kasper – mix engineer
Sam Hofstedt – assistant engineer
Bob Ludwig – mastering engineer
Cliff Ritchey – photography
Marshall Jones – design

References 

2009 albums
The Elms (band) albums